The 1925 North Carolina Tar Heels football team was an American football team that represented the University of North Carolina as a member of the Southern Conference during the 1925 season. North Carolina compiled a 7–1–1 record (4–0–1 against conference opponents, finished third in the conference, shut out six of nine opponents, and outscored all opponents by a total of 123 to 20. The team played its home games at Emerson Field in Chapel Hill, North Carolina.

Bill Fetzer was the team's head coach, and his brother Bob Fetzer was the school's athletic director. In January 1926, Bill Fetzer resigned as head coach to pursue more lucrative opportunities in the real estate business.

Schedule

References

North Carolina
North Carolina Tar Heels football seasons
North Carolina Tar Heels football